Enes Erkan (born 10 May 1987 in Adapazarı, Turkey) is a World and European champion Turkish karateka competing in the kumite +84 kg division. He transferred from the İstanbul Büyükşehir Belediyesi S.K. to the Sakarya  Büyükşehir Belediyesi S.K. He studies physical education and sports at Sakarya University.

Achievements
2017
  European Championships – 6 May, İzmit, TUR – kumite +84 kg,

2015
  1st European Games - 14 June, Baku, AZE - kumite +84 kg

2014
  2014 World Karate Championships - 5-9 Nov, Bremen, GER - kumite +84 kg
  European Championships - 1–4 May, Tampere, FIN - kumite +84 kg

2013
  XVII Mediterranean Games - 28 June, Mersin TUR - kumite +84 kg
  European Championships - 5–9 May, Budapest, HUN - kumite +84 kg

2012
  World Championships - 21–25 November, Paris, FRA - kumite +84 kg
  European Championships - 10–13 May, Adeje, ESP - kumite +84 kg

2010
  Open de Paris - 16 January, Paris, FRA - kumite -84 kg

2009
  European Championships - 8 May, Zagreb CRO - kumite -84 kg

2008
  European Championships - 2 May, Tallinn EST - kumite -80 kg
  European Junior and Cadet Championships - 15 February, Trieste ITA - kumite -80 kg

2007
  World Junior and Cadet Championships - 19 October, Istanbul TUR - kumite -80 kg
  German Open - 15 September, Aschaffenburg GER - kumite -80 kg
  Italian Open - 31 March, Monza ITA - kumite -80 kg

2005
  European Junior and Cadet Championships - 11 February, Thessaloniki GRE - kumite -75 kg

2003
  World Junior and Cadet Championships - 24 October, Marseille FRA - kumite -70 kg

References

1987 births
Sportspeople from Adapazarı
Living people
Turkish male karateka
Sportspeople from Istanbul
Istanbul Büyükşehir Belediyespor athletes
Sakarya University alumni
European Games gold medalists for Turkey
European Games medalists in karate
Karateka at the 2015 European Games
Mediterranean Games silver medalists for Turkey
Competitors at the 2013 Mediterranean Games
Mediterranean Games medalists in karate
Islamic Solidarity Games medalists in karate
Islamic Solidarity Games competitors for Turkey
20th-century Turkish people
21st-century Turkish people